Brendan Scannell (born June 20, 1990) is an American actor and comedian known for playing the lead roles of Heather Duke in the Paramount Network series Heathers (2018) and Pete Devon in the Netflix dark comedy series Bonding (2019-2021) for which he received a nomination for the Primetime Emmy Award for Outstanding Actor In A Short Form Comedy Or Drama Series.

Early life 
Scannell was born in Chicago, Illinois and raised in Valparaiso, Indiana. He studied theatre at Northwestern University and started performing improv and stand-up in Chicago before moving to Los Angeles in 2013.

Career 
In 2016, Scannell was cast as the genderqueer Heather Duke in the TV Land adaptation of Heathers. After the pilot was ordered to series, the project was moved to Paramount Network and released in October 2018. From 2019 to 2021, Scannell starred in the short-form Netflix series Bonding opposite Zoe Levin and appeared in the indie romantic comedy Straight Up.  For his work in the second season of Bonding he earned his first Primetime Emmy Award nomination for Outstanding Actor In A Short Form Comedy Or Drama Series.

As a comic, Scannell was named by Vulture in 2018 as a "Comedian You Should and Will Know" and in 2019 was named a New Face of Comedy at Just For Laughs in Montreal.

Filmography

Awards and nominations

References

External links

1990 births
21st-century American comedians
21st-century American male actors
American gay actors
Gay comedians
LGBT people from Illinois
LGBT people from Indiana
Living people
Male actors from Chicago
Male actors from Indiana
Northwestern University alumni
People from Valparaiso, Indiana
21st-century LGBT people
American LGBT comedians